Hadi Khani may refer to:
 Hadi Khani, Khuzestan
 Hadi Khani, Yazd